The 1966 San Francisco State Gators football team represented San Francisco State College—now known as San Francisco State University—as a member of the Far Western Conference (FWC) during the 1966 NCAA College Division football season. Led by sixth-year head coach Vic Rowen, San Francisco State compiled an overall record of 7–3 with a mark of 5–1 in conference play, placing second in the FWC. For the season the team outscored its opponents 235 to 134. The Gators played home games at Cox Stadium in San Francisco.

Schedule

Team players in the NFL
The following San Francisco State players were selected in the 1967 NFL Draft.

References

San Francisco State
San Francisco State Gators football seasons
San Francisco State Gators football